Jackson Township is a township in Ocean County, in the U.S. state of New Jersey. A portion of the township is located within the New Jersey Pine Barrens. As of the 2020 United States census, the township's population was 58,544, an increase of 3,688 (+6.7%) from the 2010 census count of 54,856, which in turn reflected an increase of 12,040 (+28.1%) from the 42,816 counted in the 2000 census.

Roughly equidistant between New York City and Philadelphia, Jackson is the site of Six Flags Great Adventure, home to the  Kingda Ka, which as of 2022 is the tallest roller coaster in the world. Jackson is also home to Six Flags Hurricane Harbor and the  Safari Off Road Adventure, which replaced Six Flags Wild Safari in 2013.

History
Jackson Township was incorporated as a township by an act of the New Jersey Legislature on March 6, 1844, from portions of Dover Township (now Toms River Township), Freehold Township and Upper Freehold Township, while the area was still part of Monmouth County. The township was named for president Andrew Jackson, a year before his death. It became part of the newly created Ocean County on February 15, 1850. Portions of the township were taken to form Plumsted Township on March 11, 1845.

Geography
According to the United States Census Bureau, the township had a total area of 100.55 square miles (260.43 km2), including 99.17 square miles (256.86 km2) of land and 1.38 square miles (3.57 km2) of water (1.37%). Jackson is the largest municipality by area in Ocean County.

Vista Center (with a 2010 population of 2,095) is an unincorporated community and census-designated place (CDP) located within Jackson Township. Other unincorporated communities, localities and populated places located completely or partially within the township include Archers Corner, Bennetts Mills, Burksville, Butterfly Bridge, Cassville, Colliers Mills, DeBow Corner, Francis Mills, Grayville, Harmony, Holmansville, Holmeson, Hyson, Jackson Mills, Kapps Corner, Leesville, Legler, Maryland, Midwood, New Prospect, Pleasant Grove, Prospertown, Ridgeway State Forest, Success, The Alligator, Van Hiseville, Webbsville, Whitesbridge and Whitesville.

The township borders Lakewood Township, Manchester Township, Plumsted Township and Toms River Township in Ocean County; and Freehold Township, Howell Township, Millstone Township and Upper Freehold Township in Monmouth County.

Colliers Mills Wildlife Management Area is a  wildlife management area located within portions of both Jackson Township and Plumsted Township operated by the New Jersey Department of Environmental Protection's Division of Fish and Wildlife. Several man-made lakes are located within the township, including Success Lake in the Colliers Mills Wildlife Management Area.

The township is one of 11 municipalities in Ocean County that are part of the Toms River watershed.

Climate
Jackson Township, New Jersey, gets  of rain per year. Snowfall is  inches and the number of days with any measurable precipitation is 115. On average, there are 206 sunny days per year in Jackson. The July high is around 86 degrees and the January low is 23. The comfort index is 45 out of 100.

Demographics

Jackson Township is a suburban community that is sparsely populated, with most residents owning their homes.

2010 census

The Census Bureau's 2006–2010 American Community Survey showed that (in 2010 inflation-adjusted dollars) median household income was $86,327 (with a margin of error of +/− $2,941) and the median family income was $96,171 (+/− $2,734). Males had a median income of $68,985 (+/− $4,126) versus $45,714 (+/− $2,238) for females. The per capita income for the township was $34,521 (+/− $912). About 2.8% of families and 3.8% of the population were below the poverty line, including 4.4% of those under age 18 and 3.5% of those age 65 or over.

2000 census
As of the 2000 United States census there were 42,816 people, 14,176 households, and 11,269 families residing in the township. The racial makeup of the township was 91.26% White, 3.90% African American, 0.13% Native American, 2.06% Asian, 0.01% Pacific Islander, 0.97% from other races, and 1.67% from two or more races. Hispanic or Latino of any race were 5.78% of the population.

There were 14,176 households, out of which 44.0% had children under the age of 18 living with them, 66.7% were married couples living together, 8.9% had a female householder with no husband present, and 20.5% were non-families. 16.0% of all households were made up of individuals, and 6.1% had someone living alone who was 65 years of age or older.  The average household size was 2.99 and the average family size was 3.38.

In the township the population was spread out, with 29.7% under the age of 18, 6.5% from 18 to 24, 34.2% from 25 to 44, 20.3% from 45 to 64, and 9.4% who were 65 years of age or older. The median age was 35 years. For every 100 females, there were 95.5 males.  For every 100 females age 18 and over, there were 92.1 males.

The median income for a household in the township was $65,218, and the median income for a family was $71,045. Males had a median income of $51,276 versus $33,882 for females. The per capita income for the township was $23,981. About 2.5% of families and 3.7% of the population were below the poverty line, including 3.2% of those under age 18 and 6.3% of those age 65 or over.

Orthodox Jewish community
Since 2016, the Orthodox Jewish population has been growing in central and eastern Jackson Township, along the border with Lakewood Township, due to the more affordable housing and quieter lifestyle that Jackson Township offers over Lakewood. By 2020, the Orthodox Jewish community had grown to approximately 500 families, out of 19,400 total households, from a limited presence just a few years prior.

A series of pending lawsuits allege that Jackson Township has passed multiple ordinances trying to stymie movement from Lakewood to Jackson. A "no knock" ordinance had been passed by Jackson prohibiting door-to-door solicitation after residents complained of an increase in real estate solicitations. Ordinances were passed that were restrictive to the Orthodox Jewish lifestyle; efforts to open yeshivas in the township, often accompanied by dormitories, were blocked by newly adopted ordinances that restricted new schools and prohibited dormitories. Eruvs (symbolic religious enclosures) were determined not to meet building and construction codes after a new ordinance was passed that tightened restrictions on items placed in the public "right-of-way". To address this last concern, the township entered into a preliminary settlement allowing eruvs in some parts of town, and proposed a town-wide solution that was ultimately deemed impractical.

In addition, the United States Department of Justice and the New Jersey Attorney General have opened investigations into whether the township practiced anti-Semitic discrimination, filing multiple subpoenas against township officials. These investigations culminated in May 2020 with a federal lawsuit brought by the Department of Justice against the township, alleging violations of the Religious Land Use and Institutionalized Persons Act and the Fair Housing Act related to the township's new land use laws.

Economy

The Jackson Premium Outlets are an open-air outlet power center owned by the Simon Property Group. It is located off of I-195, CR 537, and CR 526/CR 571 in Jackson Township. The facility opened in 1997, and was expanded in 1998. The outlets are located roughly 2.5 miles away from the amusement park Six Flags Great Adventure, the second-largest theme park in the world following Disney's Animal Kingdom.

Media
The Asbury Park Press provides daily news coverage of the township, as does WOBM-FM radio. The township provides material and commentary to The Jackson Times, which is one of seven weekly papers from Micromedia Publications. In addition, JTOWN Magazine provides news, sports and other local information.

Sports
In 2015, the Jackson Little League 12-year-old All-Stars won the state championship, and went on to the Mid-Atlantic Regional final where they lost to Red Land Little League from Pennsylvania who eventually won the U.S. Championship, but fell to the team from Japan in the 2015 Little League World Series.

In 2017, the Holbrook Little League All-Stars defeated Maryland 8–3, sending Holbrook to the 2017 Little League World Series.

Government

Local government
Jackson Township adopted the Mayor-Council form of government under the Faulkner Act as of July 1, 2006. The township is one of 71 (of the 564) municipalities statewide governed under this form. The governing body is comprised of the Mayor and the five-member Township Council, who are elected at-large on a non-partisan basis. Council members serve four-year terms on a staggered basis, with either two or three seats coming up for election in even-numbered years as part of the November general election. The Mayor is elected directly by the voters to a four-year term of office that comes up for election during the same year that two council seats are up for a vote. The Council selects a President and a vice president from among its members. Until 2006, Jackson Township was governed under the Township form of government with a five-member Township Committee, whose members were elected directly by the voters in partisan elections to serve three-year terms of office on a staggered basis, with one or two seats coming up for election each year. In June 2011, the Township Council passed an ordinance shifting nonpartisan elections from May to November.

, the Mayor of Jackson Township is Michael "Mike" Reina, whose term of office ends December 31, 2022. Township Council members are Council President Martin Flemming (2024), Council Vice President Andrew Kern (2022), Nino Anthony Borrelli (2024), Stephen M. Chisholm, Jr. (2024) and Alexander Sauickie III (2022).

In May 2020, Council President Barry Calogero resigned from office from his term expiring in December 2020.

In January 2020, the Township Council appointed Martin Flemming to fill the seat expiring in December 2020 that became vacant following the resignation of Robert Nixon.

Public safety departments
Police Department
Jackson Township has its own Police Department which was established in 1946 and which operates out of the Municipal Justice Complex. The Chief of Police is Matthew D. Kunz.

Fire Department
Jackson Township has three fire districts and an industrial fire department:
Station 54 – Jackson Mills Fire Co./Jackson Fire District No. 4 (combination volunteer / career) Chief Trask O'Hara
Station 55 –  Jackson Township Fire Co. No. 1/Jackson Twp Fire District No. 3 (combination) Chief Timothy Carson
Station 56 – Cassville Fire Co./Jackson Fire District No. 2 (combination volunteer/career) Chief John Poppe Jr.
Station 57 – Whitesville Fire Co./Jackson Fire District No. 2 (combination volunteer/career) Chief Flemming
Station 58 – Six Flags Great Adventure Emergency Services- Division of Fire Rescue Chief Palmer

Fire Bureau
Jackson Township has 3 Fire Bureaus that enforce the NJ Uniform Fire Safety Act:

Jackson Bureau of Fire Prevention District 2 Fire Official Scott Rauch

Jackson Bureau of Fire Prevention District 4 Fire Official Stanley O'Brien Jr.

Jackson Bureau of Fire Safety Fire Districts 3 Fire Official Mike Grossman

Emergency Medical Services
Currently emergency medical services are provided by the township's first aid squad.

Squad 22 – Jackson Township EMS (Combination Career/Volunteer) Chief Al Couceiro
Squad 80 – Six Flags Great Adventure Emergency Services- Division of EMS

Advanced life support E.M.S., (i.e., paramedics or "Mobile Intensive Care Units"), is provided by hospital providers under a statewide system mandated by the New Jersey Department of Health and Senior Services. Jackson Township is served primarily by MONOC paramedic units. until April 1, 2020, at 07:00 hrs at which time, MONOC will be out of business and RWJ Mobile Healthcare will assume responsibility for providing ALS service to Jackson Township.

Federal, state and county representation
Jackson Township is located in the 4th Congressional District and is part of New Jersey's 12th state legislative district. Prior to the 2011 reapportionment following the 2010 Census, Jackson Township had been in the 30th state legislative district.

 

Ocean County is governed by a Board of County Commissioners comprised of five members who are elected on an at-large basis in partisan elections and serving staggered three-year terms of office, with either one or two seats coming up for election each year as part of the November general election. At an annual reorganization held in the beginning of January, the board chooses a Director and a Deputy Director from among its members. , Ocean County's Commissioners (with party affiliation, term-end year and residence) are:

Commissioner Director John P. Kelly (R, 2022, Eagleswood Township),
Commissioner Deputy Director Virginia E. Haines (R, 2022, Toms River),
Barbara Jo Crea (R, 2024, Little Egg Harbor Township)
Gary Quinn (R, 2024, Lacey Township) and
Joseph H. Vicari (R, 2023, Toms River). Constitutional officers elected on a countywide basis are 
County Clerk Scott M. Colabella (R, 2025, Barnegat Light),
Sheriff Michael G. Mastronardy (R, 2022; Toms River) and
Surrogate Jeffrey Moran (R, 2023, Beachwood).

Politics
As of March 2011, there were a total of 34,003 registered voters in Jackson Township, of which 7,177 (21.1%) were registered as Democrats, 7,693 (22.6%) were registered as Republicans and 19,108 (56.2%) were registered as Unaffiliated. There were 25 voters registered to other parties. Among the township's 2010 Census population, 62.0% (vs. 63.2% in Ocean County) were registered to vote, including 82.3% of those ages 18 and over (vs. 82.6% countywide).

In the 2016 presidential election, Republican Donald Trump received 62.5% of the vote (16,910 cast), ahead of Democrat Hillary Clinton with 34.3% (9,275 votes), and other candidates with 3.2% (856 votes), among the 27,041 cast by the township's voters. In the 2012 presidential election, Republican Mitt Romney received 55.5% of the vote (13,752 cast), ahead of Democrat Barack Obama with 43.3% (10,728 votes), and other candidates with 1.1% (279 votes), among the 24,925 ballots cast by the township's 36,446 registered voters (166 ballots were spoiled), for a turnout of 68.4%. In the 2008 presidential election, Republican John McCain received 55.2% of the vote (14,069 cast), ahead of Democrat Barack Obama with 43.0% (10,951 votes) and other candidates with 1.2% (296 votes), among the 25,480 ballots cast by the township's 34,749 registered voters, for a turnout of 73.3%. In the 2004 presidential election, Republican George W. Bush received 58.7% of the vote (12,451 ballots cast), outpolling Democrat John Kerry with 39.9% (8,458 votes) and other candidates with 0.6% (185 votes), among the 21,202 ballots cast by the township's 29,329 registered voters, for a turnout percentage of 72.3.

In the 2017 gubernatorial election, Republican Kim Guadagno received 62.0% of the vote (9,232 cast), ahead of Democrat Phil Murphy with 36.0% (5,359 votes), and other candidates with 1.9% (288 votes), among the 14,879 cast by the township's voters. In the 2013 gubernatorial election, Republican Chris Christie received 73.9% of the vote (11,171 cast), ahead of Democrat Barbara Buono with 24.4% (3,693 votes), and other candidates with 1.7% (259 votes), among the 15,356 ballots cast by the township's 36,215 registered voters (233 ballots were spoiled), for a turnout of 42.4%. In the 2009 gubernatorial election, Republican Chris Christie received 66.8% of the vote (11,564 ballots cast), ahead of Democrat Jon Corzine with 26.7% (4,620 votes), Independent Chris Daggett with 4.3% (737 votes) and other candidates with 1.1% (194 votes), among the 17,315 ballots cast by the township's 34,318 registered voters, yielding a 50.5% turnout.

Education
The Jackson School District serves students in kindergarten through twelfth grade. The district operates six elementary schools serving grades K–5, two middle schools and two high schools. In January 2015, the Jackson Board of Education voted to implement full-day kindergarten, which was introduced in September 2015. As of the 2018–19 school year, the district, comprised of 10 schools, had an enrollment of 8,304 students and 665.1 classroom teachers (on an FTE basis), for a student–teacher ratio of 12.5:1. Schools in the district (with 2018–19 enrollment data from the National Center for Education Statistics) are 
Crawford-Rodriguez Elementary School (674 students; in grades Pre-K–5), 
Elms Elementary School (705; Pre-K–5), 
Lucy N. Holman Elementary School (549; K–5), 
Howard C. Johnson Elementary School (463; K–5), 
Sylvia Rosenauer Elementary School (307; Pre-K–5), 
Switlik Elementary School (751; K–5), 
Carl W. Goetz Middle School (1,129; 6–8), 
Christa McAuliffe Middle School (845; 6–8), 
Jackson Liberty High School (1,177; 9–12) and 
Jackson Memorial High School (1,620; 9–12).

Mother Seton Academy, a Catholic School for grades Pre-K–8, which operates under the auspices of the Roman Catholic Diocese of Trenton, is in nearby Howell Township. It formed in 2019 by the merger of St. Aloysius and St. Veronica schools; the former was in Jackson and the latter was in Howell.

Transportation

Roads and highways

Interstate 195 is a major artery that travels through the northern section of Jackson (Jackson is the only municipality in Ocean County that hosts any interstate). While the expressway travels into Howell and Millstone Townships, it is also a vital link for Six Flags since it provides direct connections to the Garden State Parkway, New Jersey Turnpike (Interstate 95) and Interstate 295.

CR 526, CR 527, CR 528, CR 537, CR 547, and CR 571 pass through the township. CR 539 also passes through the township, but in the southwest corner, for less than half a mile.

Public transportation
The Monmouth Ocean Middlesex Line a proposed NJ Transit project which would connect Monmouth, Ocean and Middlesex counties to the rest of the system's rail network. Jackson township would be a potential stop for the 'MOM' Line.

, NJ Transit provides Jackson bus service on the 317 line between Philadelphia and the Jersey Shore, and seasonal express service on the 308 line between Great Adventure and Midtown Manhattan's Port Authority Bus Terminal. Nearby Howell connects to Port Authority with frequent service on the 139 line and its 130, 132, 136 variants, and connects to Newark Liberty Airport on the 67 line. Nearby Lakewood also connects to Toms River and Atlantic City on the 559 line.

Academy Bus offers service to Port Authority New York and to Wall Street in Lower Manhattan, with multiple stops in Jackson and surrounding towns.

Weekly trips to local shopping centers can be reserved on the "Jackson Flex Route" of the Ocean Ride Shoppers Loop.

Notable people

People who were born in, residents of, or otherwise closely associated with Jackson Township include: ((B) denotes that the person was born there.)
 Cassidy Benintente (born 1994), defender and midfielder for Sky Blue FC of the National Women's Soccer League
 Parker Bohn III (born 1963), professional bowler
 Elijah Boothe, actor best known for his role in Luke Cage
 Deena Nicole Cortese (born 1987), reality television personality who appeared on the MTV reality show Jersey Shore from 2010 to 2012
 Melvin Cottrell (1929–2002), former mayor of Jackson Township who served in the New Jersey General Assembly from 1992 until his death
 Scotty Cranmer (born 1987), BMX rider
 Joey DeZart (born 1998), professional soccer player who plays as a midfielder for Orlando City in Major League Soccer
 Rich Gaspari (born 1963), former professional bodybuilder and CEO of Gaspari Nutrition
 Erin Gleason (born 1977), short track speed skater who competed in three events at the 1998 Winter Olympics
 Frank B. Holman (–2005), former mayor of Jackson Township and New Jersey Republican State chairman
 Rob Johnson (born 1973), former professional soccer player who played for the MetroStars
 Vini Lopez (born 1949), drummer who played with the E Street Band
 Gina Lynn (born 1974), pornographic actress
 Steve Niles (born 1965), writer of 30 Days of Night (B)
 Stephen Panasuk (born 1989), quarterback for the Cleveland Gladiators of the Arena Football League
 Johnny Petraglia (born 1947), professional bowler
 Anthony Ranaudo (born 1989), pitcher who has played for the Boston Red Sox
 Anthony Stolarz (born 1994), goaltender for the Anaheim Ducks of the National Hockey League
 Stanley Switlik (1890–1981), parachuting pioneer who donated the land that is the site of Switlik Elementary School
 Tom Tarver, quarterback who played for the Rutgers University Scarlet Knights
 Matt Thaiss (born 1995), first round pick in the 2016 MLB Draft by the Los Angeles Angels
 Zakk Wylde (born 1967 as Jeffrey Phillip Wiedlandt), guitarist for Ozzy Osbourne and Black Label Society

References

External links

Jackson Township website

 
1844 establishments in New Jersey
Faulkner Act (mayor–council)
Populated places in the Pine Barrens (New Jersey)
Populated places established in 1844
Townships in Ocean County, New Jersey